Robin Cass is a Canadian film and television producer. He is most noted as the producer of John Greyson's film Lilies, which won the Genie Award for Best Picture at the 17th Genie Awards in 1996. He has also been a supervising producer for the CBC TV series Kim's Convenience.

A graduate of the Ontario College of Art and Design, he joined with Louise Garfield and Anna Stratton in 1994 to form Triptych Media. The company's other productions have included the films Falling Angels, The Republic of Love, Zero Patience and The Hanging Garden, and the television dramas Lucky Girl, The Tale of Teeka and Heyday!

In 2020, he founded Cass & Co, a production company based in Vancouver. Projects in development include an adaptation of Waubgeshig Rice's novel Moon of The Crusted Snow, and a docu-series based on Brian Goldman's non-fiction book The Power of Kindness.

Filmography
Lilies - Les feluettes (1996, producer)
Falling Angels (2003, producer)
Heyday! (2006, producer)
Amal (2007, executive producer)
Emotional Arithmetic (2007, executive producer)
As Slow as Possible (2008, producer)
High Life (2009, producer) 
Down the Road Again (2011)
Kim's Convenience (2016-17, supervising producer)

References

External links
 

Canadian film producers
Canadian television producers
Canadian Screen Award winners
Living people
OCAD University alumni
20th-century Canadian LGBT people
LGBT film producers
LGBT television producers
Year of birth missing (living people)
21st-century Canadian LGBT people